The Enfield Shakers Historic District encompasses some of the surviving remnants of a former Shaker community in Enfield, Connecticut.  Founded in the 1780s, the Enfield Shaker community remained active until 1917.  The surviving buildings of their once large community complexes are located in and around Taylor Road in northeastern Enfield, and were listed as a historic district on the National Register of Historic Places in 1979.  The listing included 15 contributing buildings and one contributing site.

History
The Enfield Shaker community was the only Shaker settlement in Connecticut (others were in Massachusetts, New Hampshire, New York, Indiana, Ohio, Kentucky) and was significant for its garden-seed business.  The Enfield settlement, was founded in the 1780s, and lasted until 1917.  There were three distinct centers of development, called "families" by the Shakers.  Some of their land was taken for construction of the Enfield Correctional Institute, a state prison.

The district included all 15 buildings that survive, out of about six times as many existing in 1917.  In 1978, the surviving buildings include a meetinghouse, a large brick residence, an ice house, five barns, a sawmill, a slaughterhouse, a laundry, and several workshops, in three village-like clusters.  Most of these buildings date to the period 1830–60, when the community was at its height.  These buildings, as well as a portion of Shaker-developed landscape are located mainly on the west side of Taylor Road between Moody Road in the south and Sandhill Road to the north.  A few buildings are on Cybulski Road north of Moody, nearly surrounded by modern development.

See also
Shaker Seed Company
National Register of Historic Places listings in Hartford County, Connecticut

References

National Register of Historic Places in Hartford County, Connecticut
Buildings and structures completed in 1827
Historic districts in Hartford County, Connecticut
Shaker communities or museums
Historic districts on the National Register of Historic Places in Connecticut
1827 establishments in Connecticut
Enfield, Connecticut